The 1922 St. Louis Browns season was a season in American baseball. It involved the Browns winning 93 games, the only time in franchise history that the Browns topped the 90 win plateau. In the American League standings, the Browns finished in second place behind the New York Yankees. The Browns set a franchise record with 712,918 fans coming to watch the games. This was approximately 100,000 higher than the previous high.

Regular season 

The Browns of 1922 had one of the best seasons in the history of the franchise. As a team, the Browns had a batting average of .310, which led the entire Major Leagues.

George Sisler had a batting average of .420, which was the third highest batting average in the 20th century. Sisler led the league with 246 hits, 18 triples, 134 runs scored and 51 stolen bases. It was the only time that a Brown would lead the American League in triples and runs scored. It would also be the last time that a Brown led the American League in batting average.

Ken Williams became the first player in the history of Major League Baseball to hit 30 home runs and steal 30 bases in a season. The feat would not be accomplished again until Willie Mays did it in 1957. Williams batted .332 and led the American League with 39 home runs and 155 runs batted in. He also stole 37 bases, finishing second in the league to Sisler.

The Browns were in first place for 69 days but the New York Yankees overtook them on September 8. The Browns could have regained first place but lost two of three games to New York in a later September series. In the last game of the series, the Browns had a 2–0 lead in the eighth inning. New York scored once in the eighth and then scored two more runs in the ninth inning to win the game.

On the second to last day of the season, the Boston Red Sox sent rookie pitcher Alex Ferguson to pitch against New York. The Yankees countered with Waite Hoyt who allowed only one run over eight innings. The win clinched the pennant for the Yankees.

Season standings

Record vs. opponents

Opening Day lineup 
Jack Tobin RF	
Frank Ellerbe 3B		
George Sisler 1B	
Ken Williams LF		
Baby Doll Jacobson CF	
Hank Severeid C		
Wally Gerber SS		
Marty McManus 2B	
Urban Shocker P

Roster

Player stats

Batting

Starters by position 
Note: Pos = Position; G = Games played; AB = At bats; H = Hits; Avg. = Batting average; HR = Home runs; RBI = Runs batted in

Other batters 
Note: G = Games played; AB = At bats; H = Hits; Avg. = Batting average; HR = Home runs; RBI = Runs batted in

Pitching

Starting pitchers 
Note: G = Games pitched; IP = Innings pitched; W = Wins; L = Losses; ERA = Earned run average; SO = Strikeouts

Other pitchers 
Note: G = Games pitched; IP = Innings pitched; W = Wins; L = Losses; ERA = Earned run average; SO = Strikeouts

Relief pitchers 
Note: G = Games pitched; W = Wins; L = Losses; SV = Saves; ERA = Earned run average; SO = Strikeouts

Notes

References 
1922 St. Louis Browns team page at Baseball Reference
1922 St. Louis Browns season at baseball-almanac.com

St. Louis Browns seasons
Saint Louis Browns season
St Louis